Deva Katta is an Indian American film director and screenwriter who works in Telugu cinema. He directed cult classic Telugu movies such as Vennela (2005), Prasthanam (2010), Autonagar Surya (2014), and Republic (2021). In 2010, Prasthanam was showcased in the Indian Panorama section at the International Film Festival of India. The film also won two Filmfare awards including Filmfare South Critics Award for Best film and Nandi Award for Best Feature Film in 2010.

Early life
Deva Katta was born in Eluru, Andhra Pradesh. His father, Niranjan Naidu Katta, hails from Kadapa, while his mother hails from Tirupathi, Andhra Pradesh. He holds a Master of Science degree in mechanical engineering from Wayne State University, Detroit, Michigan. He worked as a vehicle crashworthiness expert at General Motors. He is a naturalized American citizen.

Career
He graduated from film school before making a digital documentary film about Indian students in the United States, which was titled Valasa. He then debuted as a successful writer and director with the romantic comedy flick Vennela, portraying Indian students in America.

In 2015, Katta teamed up with actor Vishnu Manchu for the film Dynamite. It is a remake of the Tamil film Arima Nambi and Katta's only remake till date. Katta, however, said that he shot the film for nine days only and walked out due to creative differences. Katta was credited as the film's director nonetheless.

Filmography

Feature films

Web series

Short films

Acting roles
 D for Dopidi (2013) as A.C.P. Krishnamachari

References

External links

 

Living people
Year of birth missing (living people)
Wayne State University alumni
Indian emigrants to the United States
American people of Telugu descent
Telugu film directors
American film directors of Indian descent
Film directors from Andhra Pradesh
Screenwriters from Andhra Pradesh
Naturalized citizens of the United States
Telugu screenwriters